Out for Blood is the second album by the American rock band Farewell Flight, released in 2011. The album is composed mostly of tracks from the band's 2007 release Sound.Color.Motion., but does include the new tracks Out For Blood & Rope.  The Amazon.com digital version contains the bonus track Omaha Beach.

Track listing

References

2011 albums
Mono vs Stereo albums